Harold Louis Ginsberg, (December 6, 1903 – 1990), commonly known as H. L. Ginsberg, was a professor of biblical literature at the Jewish Theological Seminary of America in New York City in the 20th century.

Biography
Ginsberg was born in Montreal, Quebec, Canada.  He received his Ph.D. from the University of London in 1930.  He became a professor at the Jewish Theological Seminary of America (JTS), serving as the Sabato Morais Professor of Biblical History and Literature since 1941.

Ginsberg was an expert on ancient Canaanite myths.  He contributed to Ancient Near Eastern Texts Relating to the Old Testament, a key sourcebook for ancient texts that have a literary relationship with the Tanakh (Hebrew Bible, a.k.a. Old Testament.) During the 1930s and '40s he was the leading scholar of the newly discovered north Canaanite language of Ugarit, as well as a major scholar of Aramaic.

Ginsberg was also one of the key translators of the New Jewish Publication Society of America Version' of the Hebrew Bible or Tanakh.  This was the second translation published by the Jewish Publication Society of America (JPS), superseding its 1917 version. It is a fresh translation into modern English, independent of the earlier translation or any other existing one. Current editions of this version refer to it as The Jewish Publication Society Tanakh Translation. Originally known by the abbreviation “NJV” (New Jewish Version), it is now styled as “NJPS.”  The translation follows the Hebrew or Masoretic text scrupulously, taking a conservative approach regarding conjectural emendations: It avoids them almost completely for the Torah, but mentions them occasionally in footnotes for Nevi'im and Ketuvim. Attested variants from other ancient versions are also mentioned in footnotes, even for the Torah, in places where the editors thought they might shed light on difficult passages in the Masoretic text.

Ginsberg also dedicated five years to helping to make the Hebrew Bible available in Braille. He was also an editor for the Encyclopedia Judaica.

Ginsberg has been described as "one of the greatest minds in the Jewish world" of his generation along with other professors at JTS such as Abraham Joshua Heschel, Mordecai Kaplan, and Louis Finkelstein.

Member in professional organizations

Ginsberg was a member of a number of professional organizations, including:

 Society of Biblical Literature
 American Academy for Jewish Research
 American Friends of the Israel Exploration Society
 Academy of the Hebrew Language, honorary member

Selected works
 "The North-Canaanite myth of Anath and Aqhat", Bulletin of the American Schools of Oriental Research 97 (February 1945:3-10).
 Five Megilloth and Jonah: A New Translation
 Studies in Koheleth
 The Five Megilloth and Jonah : a new translation
 The supernatural in the prophets : with special reference to Isaiah
 Studies in Daniel (Texts and studies of JTS ; vol. 14)
 The Prophets (Nevi'im) A new trans. of the Holy Scriptures
 Many Bible articles in the Encyclopedia Judaica

References

1903 births
1990 deaths
People from Montreal
Canadian Jews
Jewish Theological Seminary of America people
Jewish translators of the Bible
20th-century Canadian translators